Elizabeth Whittall (May 26, 1936 – May 1, 2015) was a Canadian competitive swimmer from Montreal, Quebec, Canada.

When she was 17 years old, Whittall won a silver medal in the 1954 British Empire and Commonwealth Games as a member of the Canadian 4×110 yd freestyle relay team. While studying pharmacy at Purdue University, Whittall won two gold medals at the 1955 Pan American Games in Mexico City. She also won the 100-metre butterfly and the 400-metre freestyle events and was a member of the Canadian 4x400-metre medley relay team that won a silver medal.  For those achievements, she was awarded the Lou Marsh Trophy as Canada's top athlete for 1955 and was inducted into the Canadian Olympic Hall of Fame.  At the end of that year, she held five Canadian swimming records, including the 110-yard butterfly, and the one-mile swim.  She finished seventh in the 100-metre butterfly at the 1956 Summer Olympics and retired from competition the following year.
 
In 1987, at the age of 50, Whittall set a Canadian record in the 200-metre freestyle for competitors in the 50-to-54 age group.

Whittall died on May 1, 2015, at the age of 78, and was posthumously inducted into the Canadian Olympic Hall of Fame on June 17, 2015.

References

External links
 
 
 
 
 
 
 

1936 births
2015 deaths
Anglophone Quebec people
Canadian female butterfly swimmers
Canadian female freestyle swimmers
Lou Marsh Trophy winners
Olympic swimmers of Canada
Purdue University College of Pharmacy alumni
Swimmers from Montreal
Swimmers at the 1954 British Empire and Commonwealth Games
Swimmers at the 1955 Pan American Games
Swimmers at the 1956 Summer Olympics
Pan American Games gold medalists for Canada
Pan American Games silver medalists for Canada
Commonwealth Games medallists in swimming
Commonwealth Games silver medallists for Canada
Pan American Games medalists in swimming
Medalists at the 1955 Pan American Games
Medallists at the 1954 British Empire and Commonwealth Games